Judith Simanca Herrera (born in 1975, Tierralta, Córdoba), better known by her pseudonym Victoria Sandino Palmera, is a Colombian politician and ex-insurgent. She was commander of the Revolutionary Armed Forces of Colombia until its dissolution in 2017. Since then, she is member of the Common Alternative Revolutionary Force and the committee for the implementation of the peace accord.

References 

Living people
Members of the Senate of Colombia
Members of FARC
Colombian women in politics
People from Córdoba Department
1975 births
Women in 20th-century warfare
Women in war in South America